Junín Province is a province in northwestern Junín Region, in the central highlands of Peru. Its capital is the city of Junín.

Geography
The territory of the province is mountainous and it includes Lake Junin which is the largest lake entirely on Peruvian territory, and the second-largest lake in the country after Lake Titicaca. Some of the most important rivers are the Mantaro and the Ullkumayu (Ulcomayo).

Boundaries
The province borders the Tarma Province on the southeast, Yauli Province on the southwest, and the Pasco Region provinces of Pasco on the north and northwest, and Oxapampa on the northeast.

Political division
The Junín Province is divided into four districts, each of which is headed by a mayor (alcalde):
The Junín Province is subdivided in four districts:
Junín in the south
Carhuamayo in the north
Ondores in the west
Ulcumayo in the east

See also
 Antaqucha
 Allqaqucha
 Chacamarca Historical Sanctuary
 Chiqllaqucha
 Upamayu Dam
 Waqraqucha
 Yanaqucha

Provinces of the Junín Region